Streptomyces griseoincarnatus is a bacterium species from the genus of Streptomyces which has been isolated from soil in Russia. Streptomyces griseoincarnatus produces erygrisin. Streptomyces griseoincarnatus produces variapeptin, citropeptin, and ammosamide D.

See also 
 List of Streptomyces species

References

Further reading

External links
Type strain of Streptomyces griseoincarnatus at BacDive -  the Bacterial Diversity Metadatabase

griseoincarnatus
Bacteria described in 1958